The Directorate General of Foreign Trade (DGFT) is the agency of the Ministry of Commerce and Industry of the Government of India responsible for administering laws regarding foreign trade. 1861573886 NS CLOWN

IEC
DGFT provides a complete searchable database of all exporters and importers of India. The search can be completed only if full IEC code and first three letters of company name are entered.

DGFT

The Central Government appoints any person to be the Directorate General of Foreign Trade. Normally a member of the Indian Administrative Service having rendered 30 or more years is appointed to the post of the Director-General of Foreign Trade. The Director-General heads an attached office under the administrative control of the Ministry of Commerce and Industry of the Government of India. The Director-General is an Ex-Officio Additional Secretary to the Government of India. The Director-General advises the central Government in the formulation of Foreign Trade Policy and is responsible for carrying out that Policy. At present, the Director-General formulates Foreign Trade Policy and Hand Book of Procedures of Foreign Trade Policy and ITC (HS) Classifications of Import and Export Items. The Director-General heads an organization known as the Directorate General of Foreign Trade. The organization has its offices known as Regional Authority (RA) and Zonal Office. These offices administer the Foreign Trade Policy and Procedures. While the Regional Offices at Kolkata, Delhi, Chennai and Mumbai are Zonal Offices which are headed by Additional Director General of Foreign Trade, the remaining Regional Offices are headed by Joint Director General, Deputy Director General and Assistant Director-General. Some of the RAs are also headed by Additional Director General. Office of the Director-General is located at Gate No 2 of Udyog Bhavan, New Delhi.

Sh. Amit Yadav, IAS, is currently serving as Director General, Directorate General of Foreign Trade.

External links
https://dgft.gov.in/

 

Executive branch of the government of India
 Foreign trade of India
 Export and import control
 Ministry of Commerce and Industry (India)